The Local Government Finance Act 1992 includes obligations of the occupants or (in the case of vacant properties and houses of multiple occupation) the owners of properties in the United Kingdom (except Northern Ireland) to pay Council Tax.  It repealed large sections of the Local Government Finance Act 1988, which introduced the unpopular Community Charge (known as the "poll tax"), which was replaced by the new Council Tax.

External links 

United Kingdom Acts of Parliament 1992
Local government legislation in England and Wales
Local taxation in the United Kingdom